2004–05 Bosnia and Herzegovina Football Cup was the eleventh season of the Bosnia and Herzegovina's annual football cup, and a fifth season of the unified competition. The competition started on 22 September 2004 with the First Round and concluded on 17 May 2005 with the Final.

First round
Thirty-two teams entered in the First Round. The matches were played on 22 September 2004.

|}

Second round
The 16 winners from the prior round enter this round. The first legs were played on 13 October and the second legs were played on 20 October 2004.
 

|}

Quarterfinals
The eight winners from the prior round enter this round. The first legs were played on 27 October and the second legs were played on 10 November 2004. 

|}

Semifinals
The four winners from the prior round enter this round. The first legs will be played on 6 April and the second legs were played on 13 April 2005.

|}

Final

First leg

Second leg

Sarajevo won 2–1 on aggregate.

See also
 2004–05 Premier League of Bosnia and Herzegovina

External links
Statistics on RSSSF

Bosnia and Herzegovina Football Cup seasons
Cup
Bosnia